Altaïr Ibn-LaʼAhad (meaning "The Bird, Son of No One") is a fictional character in Ubisoft's Assassin's Creed video game series. He first appears as the main playable character of the original Assassin's Creed game, which takes place during the Third Crusade in 1191. His later appearances include the spin-offs Assassin's Creed: Altaïr's Chronicles and Assassin's Creed: Bloodlines, which also feature him as the protagonist, and the sequels Assassin's Creed II and Assassin's Creed: Revelations, in which he is playable only during certain sequences.

Within the series' alternate historical setting, Altaïr is a member of the Assassin Brotherhood, a fictional organization inspired by the Order of Assassins, depicted in the games as fighting against the Templar Order to safeguard peace and humanity's free will for most of recorded history. Altaïr was born to Assassin parents in 1165, a time when the Brotherhood did not operate in secrecy, and was raised and trained by the Assassins' leader, Al Mualim, after his parents' death. After being forced to kill Al Mualim for betraying the Assassins, Altaïr succeeded him and reformed the Brotherhood, seeing how corrupted it had become. During his later journeys, he also made several important discoveries that would benefit future generations of Assassins and further establish Altaïr as a legendary figure in the history of the Brotherhood. Near the end of his life, Altaïr ensured the Brotherhood's continued existence in secrecy by splitting it into several smaller guilds across the globe, and built a library underneath the Masyaf Castle to store his knowledge and his most powerful artifact: the Apple of Eden, which he had dedicated most of his life to protecting and studying. Altaïr died in 1257 inside his library, which wouldn't be opened until centuries later, in 1512, by the Italian Assassin Ezio Auditore da Firenze.

The character has been generally well received, with praise for Altaïr's skills as an Assassin and personal growth. However, some have criticized his lack of backstory in the first game, as well as Philip Shahbaz's vocal performance. Alongside Ezio, he is typically considered the face of the franchise and one of its most popular characters, leading to several crossover appearances outside the Assassin's Creed series.

Fictional character biography 
Altaïr was born on 11 January 1165 in Masyaf, Nizari state, to Umar Ibn-La'Ahad, an Arab Muslim Assassin, and his Christian wife, Maud, who died of complications during childbirth. Altaïr lost his father at a young age, when the latter was executed by the forces of Saladin following a disastrous mission to assassinate the ruler. Umar had allowed himself to be captured to save the life of a fellow Assassin, Ahmad Sofian, who had also participated in the mission and had been forced to give up Umar's name. Following Umar's death, Ahmad, unable to live with the guilt, apologized to Altaïr before committing suicide in front of him. Ahmad's son, Abbas, who was Altaïr's best friend, was led to believe that his father had left the Assassin Brotherhood, so when Altaïr eventually told him what had actually happened, Abbas refused to believe him and grew resentful of him, fracturing their friendship.

Altaïr was subsequently raised and trained by Al Mualim, the Mentor of the Assassins, in the Masyaf Castle, the Brotherhood's headquarters. By his early 20s, he had become one of the most skilled members of the Brotherhood, making him very arrogant. In 1191, after selfishly breaking the Assassins' tenets during a mission and inadvertently leading their enemies, the Templar Order, back to Masyaf, Altaïr was demoted and tasked with assassinating nine targets to redeem himself. While he succeeded, becoming more humble and selfless along the way, he learned that Al Mualim had betrayed the Assassins and the Templars to obtain the Apple of Eden, an artifact which could grant great powers and knowledge. After killing Al Mualim, Altaïr seized leadership of the Brotherhood, as well as the Apple, which he would go on to study for decades, using the knowledge he gained to create many inventions that would benefit future generations of Assassins. These, along with the reforms he brought to the way the Brotherhood operated, ensured that he would be remembered as a legendary figure in the history of the Assassins.

During this time, Altaïr married Maria Thorpe, a former Templar, with whom he had two sons: Darim and Sef. In 1217, with the Mongol invasion of the Levant threatening the Assassins' expansion, Altaïr journeyed to Mongolia with Maria and Darim to assassinate Genghis Khan. Successful, they returned to Masyaf in 1228, only to discover that Abbas had staged a coup and killed Sef and Altaïr's best friend Malik, framing Altaïr for the latter's murder to ruin the Assassins' trust in him. Altaïr tried to take revenge, but this only resulted in Maria's death and Altaïr and Darim being forced to go into exile. Altaïr eventually fell into a deep depression which drove away his only surviving family, and he became obsessed with studying the Apple of Eden and other Precursor artifacts, which led him to discover a Precursor temple underneath the abandoned Assassin fortress of Alamut, from which he took six Memory Seals, artifacts that could store one's memories. Eventually, in 1247, Altaïr returned to Masyaf, where he gained the other Assassins' support and killed Abbas, reclaiming leadership of the Brotherhood.

In the final years of his life, Altaïr managed to mend his relationship with Darim and rebuild the Brotherhood after it had nearly collapsed under Abbas' rule. Knowing Masyaf would inevitably fall to the Mongols, he made the decision to split the Brotherhood into multiple "guilds" around the world that would operate in secrecy to ensure their continued survival. He also oversaw the construction of a library underneath the Masyaf Castle, ostensibly to store the Assassins' knowledge; in reality, it was a vault intended to protect his Apple of Eden. He locked this library using five of his six Memory Seals, which he later gave to the Assassins and travelers Niccolò and Maffeo Polo, along with his personal journal, the Codex, trusting them to hide the Seals and spread the Assassins' teachings. In 1257, as the Mongols reached Masyaf, Altaïr had it evacuated and locked himself inside his library with the Apple and the sixth Memory Seal, where he quickly passed away of old age.

Appearances

Assassin's Creed 
Altaïr is an ancestor (on the maternal side) of Desmond Miles, the protagonist of most of the early series' modern-day sequences, who experiences Altaïr's life through the Animus, a device that can unlock hidden memories inside his DNA. In the original Assassin's Creed game, Desmond is abducted by Abstergo Industries (a front for the modern-day Templar Order), who are looking for a specific memory of Altaïr learning the locations of various Pieces of Eden—artifacts created by a mysterious Precursor race to control humanity. Since that memory is inaccessible, Desmond is forced to relive the events leading up to it.

In 1191, Altaïr and two fellow Assassins, Malik Al-Sayf and his brother, are sent to Solomon's Temple to recover a Piece of Eden—the Apple—from the Templars. Altaïr arrogantly ignores the Assassins' teachings, believing himself to be above the Creed, and jumps at the opportunity to kill the Templar grandmaster, Robert de Sablé. However, he is overpowered and forced to escape, leaving Malik and his brother behind to face the Templars, which results in the former losing his left arm and the latter being slain; however, Malik is able to grab the Apple before fleeing. Upon returning to the Assassins' base in Masyaf, Altaïr discovers he has been followed by the Templars, who lay siege on the city. Altaïr helps to fend off the attack, partially redeeming himself for his mistake at Solomon's Temple. Because of this and his other feats in the past, the Assassins' Mentor, Al Mualim, chooses to spare Altaïr's life, but still punishes him by stripping him of his rank, which he must now work towards regaining.

Altaïr travels across the Holy Land to cities such as Damascus, Acre, and Jerusalem to assassinate nine individuals, all of whom are taking advantage of the Third Crusade to further their own goals, which threaten the freedom of the populace and therefore must be eliminated. However, as he kills each target, Altaïr finds that they are all secretly members of the Templar Order and that their goals are more noble than they seemed at first, even if they contradict the Assassins' ideological views. Altaïr also slowly unravels a larger conspiracy involving his targets and the Apple of Eden, and is redeemed through his quest, becoming more humble and wise and making amends with Malik. While trying to assassinate his final target, Robert himself,  Altaïr is tricked with a decoy: a woman named Maria Thorpe. Altaïr spares Maria after she reveals that Robert is meeting with King Richard I to negotiate an alliance between the Crusaders and Saracens against the Assassins, and ultimately kills Robert, foiling his plan. Before dying, Robert reveals that Al Mualim, in his desire to obtain the Apple, betrayed the Assassins and allied with the Templars, only to then betray the latter as well, so that he could keep the artifact for himself.

Altaïr returns to Masyaf, where he finds Al Mualim using the Apple to control the residents and the other Assassins as part of his plan to restore peace to the world through the forced imposition of order. With the help of Malik and several other Assassins left unaffected, Altaïr fights his way to Al Mualim, confronting his mentor in the castle's gardens. Altaïr ultimately kills Al Mualim, but cannot bring himself to destroy the Apple, and accidentally unlocks a map showing the locations of other Pieces of Eden across the globe.

Assassin's Creed: Altaïr's Chronicles and Bloodlines 
Assassin's Creed: Altaïr's Chronicles is a mobile spin-off released in 2008 that acts as a prequel to the original game. The title is set in 1190, and follows Altaïr as he attempts to retrieve an artifact called the Chalice, which he eventually discovers is a woman named Adha, whom he had known and had feelings for in the past. At the end of the game, Adha is captured by the Templars, and although Altaïr attempts to rescue her, killing the Templars' acting leader, Lord Basilisk, in the process, he is unsuccessful. In the novel Assassin's Creed: The Secret Crusade, it is revealed that Altaïr eventually found Adha again, but she had been killed by the Templars, which greatly infuriated Altaïr and contributed to his arrogance.

Assassin's Creed: Bloodlines is a 2009 PlayStation Portable exclusive game that follows Altaïr roughly one month after the ending of Assassin's Creed, as he travels Cyprus to eliminate the last remnants of the Templar Order. Here, he again runs into Maria Thorpe, and the two begin to develop feelings for each other as they reluctantly work together to learn more about the Apple of Eden and the mysterious Templar Archive on the island, where more Pieces of Eden are believed to be hidden.

Assassin's Creed: Revelations 
In Assassin's Creed: Revelations, Altaïr takes on the role of a secondary protagonist, as his legacy is explored by the main protagonist, Ezio Auditore da Firenze, an Assassin from 15th-century Italy and another ancestor of Desmond, who is reliving Ezio's memories to find a key event linking all three of them so that he could awaken from a coma. In 1511, Ezio learns about the library Altaïr built in Masyaf, which supposedly contains the key to ending the Assassin-Templar forever, and journeys there, only to find the city occupied by the Templars, who are also attempting to unlock the library. Most of the game takes place in Constantinople, where Ezio searches for the five keys to the library that were hidden by Niccolò Polo. After retrieving each key, Ezio can relive one of Altaïr's memories which the latter encoded into them, during which the player controls Altaïr.

The first memory takes place in 1189 and depicts Altaïr saving Al Mualim during a Templar attack on Masyaf, which leads to his promotion to the rank of Master Assassin. The second is set in 1191, just after Altaïr has killed Al Mualim, and shows how he became the new Mentor of the Assassin Brotherhood. One of the Assassins, Abbas, once Altaïr's best friend, opposes the idea and accuses Altaïr of just wanting power before trying to take the Apple of Eden from him. However, he is unable to bear its power, forcing Altaïr to retrieve the artifact before it kills him. After this, Altaïr convinces the rest of the Assassins of his ability to lead the Brotherhood and is formally appointed Mentor. The third memory takes place in 1228, when Altaïr and his wife Maria return to Masyaf after delaying the Mongols' invasion of the Levant, to find that Abbas has staged a coup and executed their youngest son, Sef. Furious, Altaïr tries to take revenge using the Apple, but Maria stops him, leading to her death by the blade of one of Abbas' followers. Altaïr and his eldest son, Darim, are then forced to flee Masyaf and go into a self-imposed exile.

The fourth memory is set in 1247, and depicts Altaïr's return to Masyaf to reclaim leadership of the Brotherhood, which had become a shadow of its former self under Abbas' rule. Most of the Assassins support and help him get to Abbas, whom Altaïr shoots with the Hidden Gun he had built. Altaïr comforts his former friend in his final moments, assuring him that his father did not die without reclaiming his honor (the reason for their feud in the first place), although Abbas remains doubtful until the very end and claims that he will learn the truth in the afterlife. The fifth memory is set in 1257, when the Mongols first attacked Masyaf. After fending off the attack using the Apple of Eden, Altaïr gives his journal, the Codex, and the five keys to his library to Niccolò Polo, and entrusts him to spread the teachings of the Assassins and hide the keys.

At the end of the game, Ezio returns to Masyaf and unlocks Altaïr's library after retrieving all the keys, only to find it empty; all there is left is Altaïr's skeleton holding a sixth key. Through it, Ezio witnesses the final moments of Altaïr's life and learns that the library is actually a vault for the Apple, and that Altaïr had sealed himself inside to protect it. Realizing how much Altaïr had lost because he dedicated his life to studying the Apple, Ezio chooses to leave it there, having "seen enough for one life". He then speaks directly to Desmond, knowing that he is watching, and this moment is what links the three protagonists and allows Desmond to awaken from his coma.

Other appearances

Assassin's Creed series 
Altaïr's legacy plays an important role in Assassin's Creed II, where a statue of him is located in an underground sanctuary underneath the Villa Auditore in Monteriggioni, alongside other statues of legendary Assassins or individuals important to the Assassins' history. The sanctuary also contains the Armor of Altaïr, a set of virtually indestructible armor which he created using the knowledge gained from the Apple of Eden and which was sealed away to prevent it from falling into the wrong hands. To unlock the armor, Ezio must retrieve the six seals from within the different Assassin Tombs in Italy. Additionally, pages of Altaïr's journal, the Codex, serve as in-game collectibles, and contain instructions on various weapon upgrades, such as the Poison Blade and the Hidden Gun, which will be built by Leonardo da Vinci upon delivering the pages to him. At one point during the game, Desmond begins to suffer from the "Bleeding Effect", which causes him to experience a memory of Altaïr outside of the Animus. The memory shows Altaïr chasing his wife Maria around Acre before conceiving their second son, Sef, through whom Desmond's lineage can be traced back to Altaïr. This is the only instance in the game where Altaïr is playable.

In the present-day section of Assassin's Creed IV: Black Flag, a market analysis for Abstergo Entertainment, the fictional video games subsidiary of Abstergo Industries, can be found via hacking computers. The Market Analysis reveals Abstergo was looking into the possibility of using Altaïr as a role model for Abstergo's outreach programs, but found his habit of flouting his cultures taboos (demonstrated by video of him burning Al Mualim's body) and passed on using Altaïr, instead deciding to focus on fellow Assassin Abbas Sofian, whose character they found more suitable for their purposes. Despite this, in Assassin's Creed Unity, Abstergo has produced a fictional video game starring Altaïr, titled Murder in the Levant, which can be seen at the start.

Altaïr's outfit has been an unlockable cosmetic option in every mainline Assassin's Creed game since Assassin's Creed II, with the exception of Syndicate and Odyssey. In 2018, Altaïr became a playable character in the free to play role-playing mobile game Assassin's Creed Rebellion.

In literature, Altaïr has appeared as the protagonist of the novel Assassin's Creed: The Secret Crusade, which chronicles most of his life (as described by Niccolò Polo in his journal), including events not depicted in any of the games. He is also featured in the second issue of the 2017 comic book miniseries, Assassin's Creed: Reflections, which details his role in the assassination of Genghis Khan, carried out in 1227 by Altaïr's son Darim and the Mongolian Assassin Qulan Gal.

Other 

Altaïr is a playable character in the video game  Academy of Champions: Soccer.
In the video game Metal Gear Solid 4: Guns of the Patriots, player character Solid Snake can disguise himself with Altaïr's outfit.
In the video game Prince of Persia (2008), Altaïr's outfit is unlockable for the Prince to wear.
Altaïr's outfit also appears in the video game Rayman Raving Rabbids 2.
In the video game The Saboteur, the player can obtain an Altaïr trophy.
In the video game The Witcher 2: Assassins of Kings, there is an Easter egg which shows a dead assassin resembling Altaïr in a haystack.
Altaïr's outfit appears as an outfit for Noctis in the "Assassin's Festival" DLC for Final Fantasy XV.
 Altaïr's outfit appears as a Mii Sword fighter costume available via DLC for Super Smash Bros. Ultimate.

Promotion and merchandise 
Like other protagonists in the series, Altaïr has been subject to merchandise. Altaïr's likeness, along with five other series protagonists, was used for a line of character-themed wine labels as part of a joint collaboration between Ubisoft and winemaker Lot18 in 2018; the full name of his label is "2017 Altaïr Ibn-La'ahad Loire Valley IGP Cabernet Franc".

Reception

The character of Altaïr was generally well received. In 2008, The Age ranked Altaïr as the fourth greatest Xbox character of all time, declaring "Not everybody was overly enamoured with Assassin's Creed, but we have nothing but respect for its protagonist ... If everything about the game he inhabited had been as polished and brilliant as him, we certainly would have felt very differently about Assassin's Creed." The 2011 Guinness World Records Gamer's Edition lists the character as the 30th most popular video game character. He was voted as the ninth top character of the 2000s decade by ''Game Informers readers.

Altaïr won IGN's "Stars' 2007 Badasssss!" award. In 2008, Mikel Reparaz of GamesRadar ranked him as the sixth best assassin in gaming, stating "Cool talents aside, Altaïr's a pretty compelling character in his own right, gradually growing out of his arrogant-prick phase to become more noble and altruistic. And as he does, he begins to actually question the morality of what he's doing, something few of the other assassins on this list ever do." That same year, IGN's Jesse Schedeen listed Altaïr as one of the fighters they would have in their ultimate fighting game, saying he was a slightly more realistic and efficient version of the Prince from Prince of Persia. In 2009, he ranked first on FHM'''s list of most memorable hitmen in gaming. Although Altaïr ultimately did not make the cut, Game Informer staff considered his inclusion in their "30 characters that defined a decade" collection, with Joe Juba saying, "Altaïr's rise to power is no less dramatic and impressive than Ezio's – it's just most of his transformation into a peerless master assassin took place off-screen."

On the other hand, Philip Shahbaz's vocal performance, particularly his American accent, was criticized. Hilary Goldstein of IGN, in her review of the original Assassin's Creed, called the voice acting for Altaïr "abysmal," going on to say that he "speaks with an American accent and sounds as if he is auditioning for community theatre." ZTGD's Joey Guacamole offered a similar opinion in his review of the game, calling it one of the worst voice acting performances of recent memory. GameSpot's Kevin VanOrd was somewhat less critical of Shabaz's performance, writing that he did an "all-right" job as Altaïr, but still found him lacking compared to the other actors in the game. Some critics also took note of his undisclosed backstory in the original game. GameSpy's Will Tuttle, when comparing the character to Assassin's Creed IIs protagonist Ezio Auditore, wrote that while Altaïr was "undeniably badass," the lack of any backstory or motives made him difficult to care about. IGN, using results from a reader's poll and comments, also listed Altaïr as the ninth most overrated video game character, calling him to a "poor man's Prince of Persia" and declaring him a two-dimensional, very formulaic character.

References

Bibliography

External links

 Altaïr Ibn-La'Ahad on IMDb

Amputee characters in video games
Assassin's Creed characters
Fictional Arabs
Fictional blade and dart throwers
Fictional Muslims
Fictional Syrian people
Fictional criminals in video games
Fictional defectors
Fictional exiles
Fictional explorers in video games
Fictional historians
Fictional inventors in video games
Fictional knife-fighters
Fictional librarians
Fictional martial arts trainers
Fictional medieval people
Fictional philologists
Fictional outlaws
Fictional scholars
Fictional scribes
Fictional swordfighters in video games
Fictional traceurs and freerunners
Fictional warlords in video games
Male characters in video games
Video game characters introduced in 2007
Video game mascots
Video game protagonists
Vigilante characters in video games